The Balanomorpha are an order of barnacles, containing familiar acorn barnacles of the seashore. The order contains these families:

 Austrobalanidae Newman & Ross, 1976
 Balanidae Leach, 1817 (acorn barnacles)
 Bathylasmatidae Newman & Ross, 1971
 Catophragmidae Utinomi, 1968
 Chelonibiidae Pilsbry, 1916 (turtle barnacles)
 Chionelasmatidae Buckeridge, 1983
 Chthamalidae Darwin, 1854 (star barnacles)
 Coronulidae Leach, 1817 (whale barnacles)
 Elminiidae Foster, 1982
 Pachylasmatidae Utinomi, 1968
 Pyrgomatidae Gray, 1825 (coral barnacle)
 Tetraclitidae Gruvel, 1903
 Waikalasmatidae Ross & Newman, 2001
 † Pachydiadematidae Chan et al., 2021

References

External links

Barnacles
Arthropod suborders